Jack Hill (born 1933) is an American film director

Jack Hill may also refer to:

Jack Hill (actor) (18871963), American actor who appeared in Laurel & Hardy films
Jack Hill (footballer, born 1895), English football forward for Brights, Rochdale and Bacup Borough
Jack Hill (footballer, born 1897) (18971972), England international football centre half and football manager
Jack Hill (footballer, born 1908) (1908  after 1937), English football forward for Newport County and Darlington
Jack Hill (cricketer) (19231974), Australian Test cricketer
Jack W. Hill (19281987), American with the distinction of holding Marine Corps enlisted service number one million (1,000,000)
Jack Hill (Canadian football) (19322005), Canadian Football League running back
Jack Hill (politician) (19442020), American politician and Georgia State Senator
John (Jack) Mac Hill (1925–1995), Australian rules footballer for Collingwood

See also 
Jack G. Hills (active 1966 and after), American theorist of stellar dynamics
Jack Hills, a range of hills in Western Australia
Jack Hills mine, an iron mine located in Pilbara, Western Australia
John Hill (disambiguation)
Hill (surname)